Dan Furey (England, 12 September 1909 - Lackyle, Labasheeda, 7 August 1993) was an Irish dance teacher and fiddle player. Furey specialized in classes for Set dancing, Ceili dancing and Step dancing.

Furey started in the 1930s with his lessons. At first only local, later in the whole of West-Clare, normally travelling by bicycle. In that period, many primary schools invited him to give lessons. From there his fame as dance teacher and fiddler spread and in the 1980s he was invited to give lessons in Great Britain and the United States.

In 1993, he fell ill and was hospitalized in Ennis General Hospital. There he drove doctors and nursing staff berserk, by keeping dancing, even in bed. The climax came during the Willie Clancy Summer School in July 1993, when a party of musicians broke away from the school and organized a seisiún.

Festival
As a fitting memory to their local hero, the people of Labasheeda started to organize a dance festival in 1995. They were completely taken by surprise when former students showed up from all over Ireland, United States and Great Britain. The festival still exists.

References

External links
 Videoclip of several dancers, including Dan Furey, made during the Willie Clancy Summer School 1991

1909 births
1993 deaths
20th-century Irish people
Musicians from County Clare
Irish male dancers
Irish fiddlers
20th-century violinists
Performers of Irish dance